The following is a list of recurring Saturday Night Live characters and sketches introduced between September 25, 1982, and May 14, 1983, the eighth season of SNL.

April May June
A Julia Louis-Dreyfus sketch. Debuted September 25, 1982

Mrs. T.
A Robin Duke sketch. Debuted October 2, 1982

Marvin & Celeste
A Tim Kazurinsky and Mary Gross sketch. Debuted October 2, 1982

Appearances

Alfalfa
Mary Gross impersonates the Our Gang character of Alfalfa. Debuted November 13, 1982

Havnagootiim Vishnuuerheer
A Tim Kazurinsky sketch. Debuted December 4, 1982

Saturday Night News Appearances

Unanswered Questions of the Universe

Dr. Ruth Westheimer
Mary Gross portrays Dr. Ruth Westheimer on Saturday Night News.

Appearances

Patti Lynn Hunnsacker
Patti Lynn Hunnsacker was Saturday Night News's teenage correspondent who complained about matters concerning adolescents, such as proms and dates. She was played by Julia Louis-Dreyfus. Debuted February 5, 1983.

Appearances

Dion's Hairstyling
An Eddie Murphy and Joe Piscopo sketch.

Appearances

References

Lists of recurring Saturday Night Live characters and sketches
Saturday Night Live
Saturday Night Live
Saturday Night Live in the 1980s